KSMX-FM (107.5 FM) is a radio station  broadcasting a Hot Adult Contemporary format. Licensed to Clovis, New Mexico, United States, the station serves the Clovis area. The station is currently owned by Rooney Moon Broadcasting, Inc.

History
The station went on the air as KICA-FM in 1981. The station was sold to Triton Broadcasting in 1982, and the call letters were changed to KCPK (K-Clovis-Portales-K108). The station was sold to Tabor Broadcasting in 1984 (Jim Tabor once PD of KLIF Dallas, WSGN Birmingham, and owner of KINT AM/FM El Paso). Calls were changed to KZZO on 1984-09-04. KZZO was an adaptation of "ZOO". There was a well known Dallas Texas station called KZEW, and the station studios were located at 1000 Sycamore across the street from the Clovis Zoo. On 1993-09-01, the station changed its call sign to KERC, on 1994-03-01 to KPWX, on 1995-07-25 to KSMX, and on 2007-09-24 to the current KSMX-FM.

Air-Staff

Mix Mornings with Camper Kyle and Amber Kaye: 6am to 10am (Show Cast)  Camper Kyle, Amber Kaye, Kelsey Laurenz (NEWS), Doc Elder (SPORTS), Mini-Coop (INTERN)

Jen Austin: 10am to 3pm

Mix Afternoons with Duffy Moon: 3pm to 7pm

References

External links

SMX-FM
Clovis, New Mexico